Jiří Kabeš, alias Kába (* 26 March 1946 in Křemín, Czechoslovakia) is a Czech rock singer, violist, violinist, guitarist and songwriter. He was a longtime member of The Plastic People of the Universe where he played on viola and violin, occasionally sang and played on theremin. In the early seventies he played with rock'n'roll group The Old Teenagers. Since 1997 he is also a member of The Velvet Underground Revival Band where he plays the guitar. He was also a member of Milan Hlavsa's band called Půlnoc and Echt!.

Selected discography

With The Plastic People of the Universe
Bez ohňů je underground (1992) - live album
For Kosovo (1997) - live album
The Plastic People of the Universe (1997) - live album
Hovězí porážka (released: 1997, recorded: 1983-84)
Jak bude po smrti (released: 1998, recorded: 1979)
Pašijové hry velikonoční (released: 1998, recorded: 1978)
Vožralej jak slíva (released: 1997, recorded: 1973-1975) - live album
Ach to státu hanobení (released: 2000, recorded: 1976-77)
Líně s tebou spím | Lazy Love / In Memoriam Mejla Hlavsa (2001)
Egon Bondy’s Happy Hearts Club Banned (released: 2001, recorded: 1974-75)
Muž bez uší (released: 2002, recorded 1969-72) - live album
Co znamená vésti koně (released: 2002, recorded: 1981)
Do lesíčka na čekanou (released: 2006, recorded? 1973) - live album
Maska za maskou (2009)
Non Stop Opera (2011) - live album

References

External links
 Jiří Kabeš at Discogs

Czechoslovak male singers
Czech violists
Czech violinists
Male violinists
Czech guitarists
Male guitarists
1946 births
Living people
The Plastic People of the Universe members
21st-century violinists
20th-century violists
21st-century violists